Badda Alatunnesa High School, South Badda, Dhaka is an educational institution in Bangladesh. Alhaj Nur Mia established this institution in the name of his mother.  At present about 6000 students are enrolled.. This institute's EIIN number is 107841. It offers classes up to Higher Secondary level.

References

Educational institutions established in 1963
High schools in Bangladesh
Private schools in Bangladesh
Schools in Dhaka District
1963 establishments in East Pakistan